Mark McCormack (born September 15, 1970, Plymouth, Massachusetts) is a professional cyclo-cross and road bicycle racer from the United States.  McCormack became the first rider to hold the U.S. national championship in cyclocross and road bicycle racing in a career.

Major results 

1997
  USA Cycling Cyclocross National Championships
1999
 1st, Stage 4, Tour of Denmark
 1st, Stage 2, Gran Prix Cycliste de Beauce, Canada
2003
  USPRO National Championships
 Overall champion, Professional Cycling Tour (PCT)
2004
 1st overall, Fitchburg Longsjo Classic
 1st overall, Giordana Classic Criterium Series
 1st overall, Green Mountain Stage Race
 1st overall, Tour of Connecticut
 1st, Downeast Cyclo Cross, Verge New England Championship Cyclo-cross Series
 1st, Whitmores Landscaping Cyclo Cross
 1st, Marblehead Circuit Race, Massachusetts
2005
 1st, Chris Thater Memorial
 1st overall, Tour of Connecticut
 2nd overall, International Tour de Toona
 1st, Stage 1
 1st, Stage 5
 1st, Tour of Grandview Criterium
2006
1st CSC Invitational
 1st, Cox Charities Cycling Classic
 1st overall, Verge New England Championship Cyclo-cross Series

On Monday November 12, 2012, McCormack took first place in one, if not the, first ever "fat tire" bicycle race at the Coonemesset Farms Eco-Cross in Falmouth, Massachusetts.  The "fat tire" race was held on the cyclocross course during Coonemesset Farms Eco-Cross and required that all participant's bicycles had a tire width no narrower than 3.5".

External links 
 Cyclingnews.com 2004 interview
  2005 Pezcyclingnews interview of Mark McCormack by Matt Wood

1970 births
Living people
American male cyclists
American cycling road race champions
Cyclo-cross cyclists
American cyclo-cross champions